The Glass Ocean was an Indie rock band from Atlanta, Georgia.

Biography
The Glass Ocean began after founding members Keller Harbin and Josh Beiser left The Chariot in May 2006 after releases Everything Is Alive, Everything Is Breathing, Nothing Is Dead, and Nothing Is Bleeding and the Unsung EP. Deciding to take a different approach, The Glass Ocean has gone through a considerably slow evolutionary process. A brief period by Keller Harbin as bassist for Every Time I Die meant that the band did not rush into releasing their music to a wide audience but instead played many local shows in the Atlanta area also stating their desire not to rely on the success of their previous musical endeavors and inevitably rush their music.

The band's first release, the self-financed Put on the Wooden Overcoat EP was released on April 29, 2008 and was made available from the band's website and as a download from iTunes.

The band has stated in interviews that they are not a Christian band, though it continues to be a common misconception.

The band announced the band's end on their Myspace.

Members
 Keller Harbin - Lead Vocals, Guitar (2006–2009) (Every Time I Die, The Chariot)(Holy+Gold)
 Joshua Beiser - Bass (2006–2009) (The Chariot)
 Heath Ladnier - Drums (2007–2009) (Holy+Gold)
 Justin Graham - Guitar (2007–2009) (Holy+Gold)
 Nick Nelson - Guitar (2006-2009)

Former members
 Brandon Proff - Drums (2007) (Fear Before The March Of Flames)

Discography
 2008: Put on the Wooden Overcoat (EP)
 2009: 21 Young Guns Salute (AMP Magazine Compilation)

External links
 Official Website

References

Indie rock musical groups from Georgia (U.S. state)
Musical groups established in 2006
Musical groups from Atlanta